The 1998–99 Evansville Purple Aces men's basketball team represented the University of Evansville in the 1998–99 NCAA Division I men's basketball season. Their head coach was Jim Crews and they played their home games at Roberts Municipal Stadium as members of the Missouri Valley Conference. After finishing alone atop the MVC regular season standings, the Purple Aces lost in the championship game of the MVC tournament. The Aces received an at-large bid to the 1999 NCAA tournament. They were defeated by No. 6 seed Kansas in the opening round and finished 23–10 (13–5 MVC).

Roster

Schedule

|-
!colspan=9 style=| Regular season

|-
!colspan=9 style=| MVC tournament

|-
!colspan=9 style=| NCAA tournament

Rankings

References

Evansville Purple Aces
Evansville Purple Aces men's basketball seasons
Evansville
Evans
Evans